Shahriyar Jamshidi (born 1971) is a Kurdish-Iranian Canadian Kamancheh player and composer. His focus is mainly on Kurdish and Iranian music.

Life and education 
Shahriyar was born in a Kurdish family in Kermanshah. Due to limitations following the Iranian Revolution in 1978, he was not able to study music until age 17. He received private music lessons under the supervision of Mahmoud Merati for two years before studying music at Tehran University of Art. In Tehran, he continued his music studies under various teachers including Ahmad Pejman, Houshang Kamkar, Ardeshir Kamkar and Taghi Binesh. He also worked under the directorship of the well known Kurdish Kamancheh player Mojtaba Mirzadeh.

Works 
 Jamshidi has been working individually and with different groups including Chakad Ensemble under the direction of Alireza Javaheri to collaborate with Bahman Rajabi at Farabi Hall in 2000.
 He established Dilan Ensemble in the memory of the Kurdish composer  in 2003, had performances in several Iranian cities including Roudaki Hall Tehran, Tirgan Festival, High-Fest Festival in Yerevan, Armenia in 2015 and McMaster University in 2018.
 As the solo Kamanche performer, he has been participating at International Security for Improvised Music Conference in Château-d'Œx, Switzerland and Wilfrid Laurier University in Canada; Ontario Contact Conference, 33rd World Conference of International Society for Music Education in Baku, Azerbaijan in July 2018.
 Jamshidi also as a co-founder and performer of the Canadian Kamanche / Cello Duo; Kamancello has performed at Festival du Monde Arabe de Montréal in 2015, Cello Biënnale Amsterdam in 2018., and collaborated with Maestro Robert Franz and Windsor Symphony Orchestra playing "Convergence Suite for Kamancello"
 He had musical collaboration with Richard Robeson in recording his album Meet me in Tangier in 2016 and with a music professor Alex Lubet in University of Minnesota School of Music in 2018.

Award and residency 
 Ontario Arts Council, Music Recording Projects to create "My Sunset-Land ROJAVA" (2020). 
 Toronto Arts Council, Music Creation and Audio Recording (2019).
 University of Minnesota, School of Music, residency in September (2018).
 World Conference Sponsor Delegate Award, International Society for Music Education (2018).
 Arts Abroad, Canada Council (2018).
 Banff Musicians in Residence program at Banff Centre in winter (2017).

Discography 
His most renowned works are:
 Alvanati (2004), it is the Kurdish folk project. This cassette is the selected songs of the late Kurdish Bard singer "Yadollah Rahmani" with Kurdish-Persian traditional orchestra.
 Call of the Mountain (2008).
 A Yellow Flower (2014), this album is arranged for the Kamanche ensemble and vocals. It is the selection of Kurdish poet Abdulla Pashew's works. A Yellow Flower has dedicated to the people of Kobani.
 Kamancello (2017), is a duo, instrumental, improvisation music and first album of kamancello duo. The scope of Kamancello's creation ranges from soulful and emotive to incendiary and intense, and its sound has been described as being "totally entrancing.
 The Lullaby of a Nomad (2018), the Kamanche Solo album is representing sounds of Kurds from Kurdish modes in improvisation.
 Kamancello II: Voyage (2019).
  My Sunset-Land ROJAVA (2020).
  Of Shadows (2020).

References

External links 
 Shahriyar Jamshidi | Official Website
 Dilan Ensemble | Official website
 Kamancello Music | Official website

People from Kermanshah
1971 births
Living people
Kurdish musicians
Iranian kamancheh players
Musicians from Kermanshah